is a Japanese swimmer. She qualified for the 2016 Summer Olympics in Rio de Janeiro in the 200 meter individual medley. She swam the 11th best time in the heats and qualified for the semifinals, where she was eliminated with a 15th-place finish.

Imai took up swimming aged three following her elder brother Hikaru, who is also a competitive swimmer. Her mother died in 2008.

As a 14-year-old at the 2014 Junior Pan Pacific Swimming Championships in Hawaii, United States, Imai won the gold medal in the 200 metre breaststroke with a time of 2:26.04, the bronze medal in the 100 metre breaststroke with a 1:09.25, and the silver medal in the 4×100 metre medley relay, splitting a 1:08.18 to contribute to the final time of 4:04.11.

References

2000 births
Living people
Japanese female freestyle swimmers
Japanese female medley swimmers
Olympic swimmers of Japan
Swimmers at the 2016 Summer Olympics
Universiade medalists in swimming
Universiade silver medalists for Japan
Universiade bronze medalists for Japan
Medalists at the 2019 Summer Universiade
21st-century Japanese women